Pablo José Cámbar (Tegucigalpa, 22 March 1943 – Tegucigalpa, 25 April 2021) was a Honduran academic, researcher, and physician. He died due to complications of COVID-19.

References

1943 births
2021 deaths
Deaths from the COVID-19 pandemic in Honduras
Honduran physicians
People from Tegucigalpa
Academic staff of Universidad Nacional Autónoma de Honduras